Soare is a surname. Notable people with the surname include:

 Anastasia Soare (born 1957/1958), American billionaire businesswoman
 Marius Soare (born 1987), Romanian football player
 Nicolae Soare (born 1991), Romanian long distance runner 
 Robert I. Soare, American mathematician
 Valeriu Soare (born 1932), Romanian football player
 Vasile Soare, Romanian diplomat